Forplay may refer to:

PlayN, an open source Java software framework and set of libraries intended to create multi-platform games
ForPlay, a 2009 EP by Saint Motel

See also
Fourplay (disambiguation)